Peter White is a professor of Classical Languages and Literatures at the University of Chicago. He has made some contributions to scholarship on Latin literature, even Roman poetics. He has written Promised Verse: Poets in the Society of Augustan Rome (Cambridge, Massachusetts, 1993), for which he won the American Philological Association's Goodwin Award in 1995. He has won some other honors, including the University of Chicago's highly prized Quantrell Award for Excellence in Undergraduate Teaching. He took his B.A. from Boston College in 1963 and his Ph.D. from Harvard University in 1972. He has been a professor at the University of Chicago since 1968. He has since been universally acclaimed as the cornerstone of the Classical Languages and Literatures department at the University.

References 

 White's CV:  

Year of birth missing (living people)
Living people
Boston College alumni
Harvard University alumni
University of Chicago faculty